Nancy McDonnell (born 26 March 1955) is a Canadian gymnast. She competed at the 1972 Summer Olympics and the 1976 Summer Olympics.

References

External links
 

1955 births
Living people
Canadian female artistic gymnasts
Olympic gymnasts of Canada
Gymnasts at the 1972 Summer Olympics
Gymnasts at the 1976 Summer Olympics
Gymnasts from Toronto
Gymnasts at the 1971 Pan American Games
Pan American Games bronze medalists for Canada
Pan American Games medalists in gymnastics
Medalists at the 1971 Pan American Games
20th-century Canadian women
21st-century Canadian women